Satsuma may refer to:
 Satsuma (fruit), a citrus fruit
 Satsuma (gastropod), a genus of land snails

Places

Japan
 Satsuma, Kagoshima, a Japanese town
 Satsuma District, Kagoshima, a district in Kagoshima Prefecture
 Satsuma Domain, a southern Japanese feudal domain led by the Shimazu clan comprising Satsuma Province, Ōsumi Province, and parts of Hyuga Province on the Kyushu island, as well as parts of Ryukyu Islands.
 Satsuma Peninsula, a peninsula in Kagoshima Prefecture
 Satsuma Province, a former province which is now the western half of Kagoshima Prefecture
 Japanese battleship Satsuma, a battleship of the Imperial Japanese Navy

United States
 Satsuma, Alabama
 Satsuma, Louisiana
 Satsuma, Texas
 Satsuma, Florida

Other uses
 Satsuma Loans, a UK-based short-term loan company
 Satsuma plum, a type of plum
 Satsuma Rebellion, a revolt
 Satsuma ware, a type of Japanese pottery
 Biwa, a lute with a form known as Satsuma biwa
 Satsuma, the car the player builds and drives in the video game My Summer Car